was a village formerly located in Hokkaido, Japan.

It controlled the Habomai Islands and the eastern part of the Nemuro Peninsula. 

After World War II, the Habomai Islands were occupied by the Soviet Union. Habomai village was dissolved in 1959 and merged into Nemuro, including the Habomai islands.

Dissolved municipalities of Hokkaido
Nemuro, Hokkaido